Gastrops is a genus of shore flies in the family Ephydridae.

Species
G. auropunctatus Hendel, 1930
G. bicuspidatus (Karsch, 1881)
G. flavipes Wirth, 1958
G. fuscivenosus Wirth, 1958
G. nebulosus Coquillett, 1900
G. niger Williston, 1897
G. ringueleti Lizarralde de Grosso, 1984
G. willistoni Cresson, 1914

References

Ephydridae
Diptera of South America
Diptera of North America
Taxa named by Samuel Wendell Williston
Brachycera genera